, born , is a Japanese actress and J-pop singer born in Tachikawa, Tokyo, Japan on 20 July 1973. She graduated in sociology at Waseda University.

She made her J-pop debut on 25 November 1987.

Filmography

Television
 Ai no Arashi (1986), young adult Hikaru (Japanese adaptation of Wuthering Heights)

Discography
SinglesNamida o Tabanete (25 Nov 1987)Eien no Utatane (5 Mar 1988)Kowareru (13 Jul 1988)Glass no Mekakushi (15 Nov 1988)Hitohira (8 Mar 1989)Natsuiro no Tenshi (12 Jul 1989)Mujitsu no Tsumi (15 Nov 1989)Hitomishiri Angel—Tenshi-tachi no Lesson (14 Mar 1990)Bathroom no Gensō (4 Jul 1990)Marionette wa Nemuranai (5 Dec 1990)Netako o Okosu Komoriuta (27 Mar 1991)Hachigatsu no Calendar (27 Sep 1991)Sunao ni Jealousy (22 Jul 1992)Koi o Shiyō to Omou (24 Feb 1993)Ai Saresugite (9 Sep 1993)Requiem (9 Nov 1994)Shinjite Ii yo ne (29 Mar 1995)Sorezore no Ai (25 Sep 1995)Aitai to Omoetanara Ii ne (25 Jan 1996)Guru Guru Suru Yoru (25 Apr 1996)Shitchitai to Kingyo (27 Nov 1999)Nami no Toriko ni Naru yō ni (21 Nov 2004)Hika Shukumei (14 Dec 2005)

Albums
Original albums

 1988.07.24 : Kowareru ~Suki to Tsutaete Suki to Kotaete~ (こわれる ~好きとつたえて 好きとこたえて~)
 1989.07.26 : Sonotoki (そのとき)
 1990.07.18 : Kare to Kanojo (彼と彼女)
 1991.09.27 : Omocha Bako Akenai (おもちゃ箱あけない)
 1992.08.12 : Doushite Kon'nani Suki Nandarou (どうしてこんなに好きなんだろう)
 1993.09.29 : Koi wo Shiyou to Omou (恋をしようと思う)
 2000.07.20 : Hito Kui hi to ku i (人喰い hi to ku i) (as OGAWA)
 2001.10.07 : Hoozuki (ホオズキ) (as OGAWA)
 2002.11.30 : Tada Ai no Tame ni ~Aimez-moi pour amour~ (ただ愛のために~Aimez-moi pour amour~)

Mini-Albums

 1987.12.25 : Namida wo Tabanete ~Anata e no Hitorigoto~ (涙をたばねて~あなたへの独り言~)
 1988.12.04 : Glass no Mekakushi ~Kiyoraka na Yoru Hitori de…~ (ガラスの目隠し~聖らかな夜ひとりで…~)
 1989.12.08 : Mujitsu no Tsumi ~Aenai Yoru Anata ga Tooi~ (無実の罪~逢えない夜 あなたが遠い~)
 1990.12.05 : Koukishin (好奇心)
 1992.12.02 : Request

Best Albums

 1990.03.28 : Gin'yuu Shoujo (吟遊少女)
 1991.12.20 : Remix Best Hachi-gatsu no Calendar (Remix Best 八月のカレンダー)
 2001.12.19 : Super Value (スーパー・バリュー)
 2006.03.01 : Golden Best Ogawa Noriko -Taurus Single Collection- (GOLDEN☆BEST 小川範子 -トーラス・シングル・コレクション-)
 2007.11.21 : Ogawa Noriko Album Best -Self Selection- Mahou no Recipe (小川範子 アルバムベスト☆ -セルフ セレクション- 魔法のレシピ)

Live Albums

 1992.10.28 : Ogawa Noriko Summer Concert '92 Dix Neuf Ans (小川範子サマー・コンサート'92 Dix Neuf Ans)

Books
 写真集『こわしたくない…』（講談社）1988年
 写真集『季節絵日記』（ワニブックス）1989年
 吟遊少女　（ＣＢＳ・ソニー出版）1989年
 写真集『TAKAN』（白泉社）1990年
 小川範子のおっこらせ日記　フォトエッセイ集（角川書店）1990年
 夢・シンフォニー　小川範子(文)＋おおた慶文(画)　（白泉社）1991年
 月刊　小川範子（新潮社）2000年

GameNo-Ri-Ko''  PC Engine CD-ROM²  4 December 1988

External links
 
 Noriko Ogawa at jdorama.com
 Profile at JMDb
 
 Idol80 Discography

1973 births
Living people
Japanese actresses
People from Tachikawa
Singers from Tokyo
21st-century Japanese singers
21st-century Japanese women singers